KBLZ (102.7 FM) is a terrestrial American radio station serving Tyler, Texas. Licensed to Winona, it broadcasts a 
Rhythmic Contemporary format in full simulcast with its sister station KAZE 106.9 Ore City, which serves the Longview/Marshall portion of the market. "The Blaze" is owned by Reynolds Radio, with studios located on Grande Boulevard, south of downtown Tyler. KBLZ's transmitter is located east of Tyler in unincorporated Smith County.

History
KBLZ received a construction permit in 1998 (as KBKV) and signed in March 2000 with its current call set. KAZE, whose sign-on was in 1989 (as KWSK, licensed previously to Daingerfield), have been simulcasting their format since 1999.  This format has a Hip Hop/R&B music lean but also incorporates Rhythmic Pop/Dance into the mix, the only station in Tyler and Longview to do so.

External links
The Blaze's website

Rhythmic contemporary radio stations in the United States
Radio stations established in 1998